The 2003–04 season was Tottenham Hotspur's 12th season in the Premier League and 26th successive season in the top division of the English football league system

Season summary
A dismal start to the season cost Glenn Hoddle his job and he was sacked as manager on 21 September after two-and-a-half years at the helm. Director of Football David Pleat took over first team duties until the end of the season but was unable to inspire Tottenham to a challenge for European qualification, nor either of the cup competitions, and a 14th-place finish in the final table was Tottenham's lowest since 1998.

Squad

Transfers

Transfers in

Transfers out

Loans in

Loan out

Released

Overall transfer activity

Expenditure 
Summer:  £11,250,000

Winter:  £7,500,000

Total:  £18,750,000

Income 
Summer:  £1,300,000

Winter:  £100,000

Total:  £1,400,000

Net totals 
Summer:  £9,950,000

Winter:  £7,400,000

Total:  £17,350,000

Competitions Overview

Premier League

League table

Results
Manager: Glenn Hoddle

Caretaker Manager: David Pleat

FA Cup

League Cup

Statistics

Appearances and goals

|-
! colspan=14 style=background:#dcdcdc; text-align:center| Goalkeepers

|-
! colspan=14 style=background:#dcdcdc; text-align:center| Defenders

|-
! colspan=14 style=background:#dcdcdc; text-align:center| Midfielders

|-
! colspan=14 style=background:#dcdcdc; text-align:center| Forwards

|-
! colspan=14 style=background:#dcdcdc; text-align:center| Players transferred out during the season

Goal scorers 

The list is sorted by shirt number when total goals are equal.

Clean sheets

References

Tottenham Hotspur
Tottenham Hotspur F.C. seasons